This is a list of episodes for the seventh season (1992–93) of the television series Married... with Children.

In this season, the writers introduced Seven (played by Shane Sweet) in an attempt to give the Bundys a third child. When the audience was unreceptive, he was removed from the series with no explanation other than being left at the D'Arcys' (Seven was last seen being told a bedtime story in "Peggy and the Pirates"). There is, however, a subtle reference to him in Season 8, episode 22, when he appears as the missing child on a carton of milk. Bud also loses his virginity during this season and he makes his first appearance with a beard (which was mistaken for dirt in the episode where Bud first notices he's growing a beard). David Garrison (Steve Rhoades) also makes another guest appearance during this season, also Dan Castellaneta (not as his character on "The Dancing Show", but as a funeral parlor salesman), as does Michael Faustino.

Amanda Bearse missed two episodes this season.

Episodes

References

1992 American television seasons
1993 American television seasons
07